Meykhvaran-e Mohammad Sadeq (also Romanized as Meykhvārān-e Moḩammad Şādeq and Meykhowrān-e Moḩammad Şādeq; also known as Mae Khuran, Maykhurān Pāīn, Meykhowrān-e Pā’īn, and Meykhvārān-e Pā’īn) is a village in Bavaleh Rural District, in the Central District of Sonqor County, Kermanshah Province, Iran. At the 2006 census, its population was 235, in 53 families.

References 

Populated places in Sonqor County